Ninh Viết Giao (Thanh Hoá, c. 1930) is a Vietnamese writer. He graduated from Hanoi University in 1956. He was one of the writers reviving an interest in folk tales such as Thằng Bờm and Truyện Trê Cóc.

Works
 Xứ Nghệ và tôi  2006

References

Vietnamese writers
Living people
Year of birth missing (living people)